Romania competed at the 2002 Winter Olympics in Salt Lake City, United States.

Alpine skiing

Women

Women's combined

Biathlon

Men

Women

 1 A penalty loop of 150 metres had to be skied per missed target. 
 2 Starting delay based on 10 km sprint results. 
 3 One minute added per missed target. 
 4 Starting delay based on 7.5 km sprint results.

Bobsleigh

Men

Women

Cross-country skiing

Men
Sprint

Pursuit

 1 Starting delay based on 10 km C. results. 
 C = Classical style, F = Freestyle

Figure skating

Men

Women

Luge

Men

(Men's) Doubles

Short track speed skating

Women

Speed skating

Women

References
Official Olympic Reports 
 Olympic Winter Games 2002, full results by sports-reference.com

Nations at the 2002 Winter Olympics
2002 Winter Olympics
Winter Olympics